In the Land of Salvation and Sin is the third studio album by U.S. southern-rock band The Georgia Satellites, released in 1989 on Elektra Records. It was produced by Joe Hardy, who'd previously produced recordings by ZZ Top and Steve Earle, and who was known for his traditional style. AllMusic's Thom Jurek gave the album 3 out of 5 stars, describing it as "...the band's most consistent and innovative recording." As of 2022, this is the most recent studio album to contain original material by The Georgia Satellites, although they did record eight new songs on their next album Shaken Not Stirred (1996).

Track listing
All songs written by Dan Baird except as indicated.

 "I Dunno" – 3:10
 "Bottle O' Tears" – 3:52
 "All Over But The Cryin'" – 5:11
 "Shake That Thing" – 5:12
 "Six Years Gone" – 3:09
 "Games People Play" (Joe South) – 3:40
 "Another Chance" – 4:33
 "Bring Down the Hammer" – 4:23
 "Slaughterhouse" (Rick Richards) – 2:47
 "Stellazine Blues" – 4:11
 "Sweet Blue Midnight" – 6:26
 "Days Gone By" – 3:34
 "Crazy" (Baird, Gina Webb) – 3:24
 "Dan Takes Five" – 3:24

Personnel
Dan Baird - vocals, guitar, dobro, piano, percussion
Rick Richards - lead and 12-string guitar, vocals
Rick Price - bass, mandolin, bouzouki, vocals
Mauro Magellan - drums, percussion, acoustic bass, vocals
Ian McLagan - piano, organ
Nicolette Larson - vocals
Steve Winstead - gang vocals
Kevin Jennings - gang vocals, harmonica

References

The Georgia Satellites albums
Elektra Records albums
1989 albums